William Richard Harry (30 November 1877 – 21 February 1943) was an Australian rules footballer who played in one game for  in 1906.

The oldest of twelve children, Harry was recruited to Carlton by Jack Worrall and made his debut in Round 11, 1906, against  at Princes Park. After his solitary game for Carlton, he returned to his family in Rutherglen. He continued to play for Rutherglen before retiring to become an umpire.

Harry died in 1943 after drowning in the Murray River attempting to retrieve a duck he had just shot.

References

External links

1877 births
1943 deaths
Australian rules footballers from Victoria (Australia)
Carlton Football Club players
Rutherglen Football Club players
Accidental deaths in Victoria (Australia)
Deaths by drowning in Australia
Hunting accident deaths